Orville Lewis Duke (August 12, 1953 – September 10, 2004) was an American stage, television and film actor.

He was a member of the renowned Actors Studio and was the interim Artistic Director of the Negro Ensemble Company (NEC) from 2002 to 2004.  In keeping with the tradition of the NEC, Duke helped young Black actors hone their skills by sharing his work experiences and teaching classes using the method acting technique.

Duke died in a car crash in New York City, on September 10, 2004. He was on his way home after performing in an off-Broadway play, when a car cut him off on the West Side Highway. His vehicle jumped a divider and struck an oncoming car.

Filmography

References

External links

Negro Ensemble Company

1953 births
2004 deaths
American male film actors
Road incident deaths in New York City
Male actors from Los Angeles
20th-century American male actors
African-American male actors
20th-century African-American people
21st-century African-American people